Courtney Yamada (born April 6, 1980) is an American skeleton racer who has competed since 2002. Her best Skeleton World Cup finish was third at Nagano in January 2007.

A native of Boise, Idaho, Yamada's best finish at the FIBT World Championships was 13th in the women's event at St. Moritz in 2007.

References
 FIBT profile

External links
 

1980 births
American female skeleton racers
Living people
Sportspeople from Boise, Idaho
21st-century American women